This is a list of properties and districts in Jasper County, Georgia that are listed on the National Register of Historic Places (NRHP).

Current listings

|}

References

Jasper
Buildings and structures in Jasper County, Georgia